Yuri Vitalyevich Volyntsev (28 April 1932 – 9 August 1999) was a Soviet and Russian stage and film actor. People's Artist of the RSFSR (1984).

Biography and career
Yuri Volyntsev was born April 28, 1932, in Leningrad. He studied at the Boris Shchukin Theatre Institute (acting course of Joseph Rapoport), at the end of school in 1962, he was accepted into the troupe of the Vakhtangov-Theatre.

He voiced set of cartoon characters. To Soviet viewers he is best known for playing the role of the Pan Athlete in the humorous TV series Cabaret "13 Chairs".

Father of actress, radio and TV presenter Ksenia Strizh.

He died on August 9, 1999. He was buried at the Khovanskoye Cemetery.

Filmography
 A Span of Earth (Пядь земли, 1964) as Cpt. Yatsenko
Time, Forward! (Время, вперёд!, 1965) as Writer
 Anna Karenina (Анна Каренина, 1967) as Vronsky's brother-soldier
 Major Whirlwind (Майор Вихрь, 1967) as Shvalb
The Secret Agent's Blunder (Ошибка резидента, 1968) as Sliva, taxi driver
 Belorussian Station (Белорусский вокзал, 1970) as police sergeant
 The Flight of Mr. McKinley (Бегство мистера Мак-Кинли, 1975) as McKinley's colleague
 Circus in the Circus (Соло для слона с оркестром, 1976) as Aleksandr Borisovich
Funny People (Смешные люди!, 1977) as Aleksei Ivanovich Romansov
Night Accident (Ночное происшествие, 1980) as Semyon Afanasyevich Astakhov, taxi driver
 Dead Souls (Мёртвые души, 1984) as Alexei Ivanovich, Chief of Police
 The Kreutzer Sonata (Крейцерова соната, 1987) as gentleman in public places
 Weather Is Good on Deribasovskaya, It Rains Again on Brighton Beach (На Дерибасовской хорошая погода, или На Брайтон-Бич опять идут дожди, 1992) as Styopa, KGB general
 Trifles of Life (Мелочи жизни, 1992–97) as Viktor Vasilyevich, special services worker

Cartoons
 Dog in Boots (1981) as Fatty
 The Mystery of the Third Planet (1981) as Cpt. Zelyony
 Alice Through the Looking Glass (1982) as Humpty Dumpty
 Two Tickets to India (1985) as tamer
Dereza (1985) as rabbit Trusha (uncredited)
 Welcome (1986) as Elk
 The Adventures of Lolo the Penguin (1987) as captain of the poachers' ship
 Laughter and Grief by the White Sea (1987) as Ivan / old listener
 DuckTales (1987–90) as Launchpad McQuack / Duckworth
 TaleSpin (1990–91) as Don Karnage
 Glasha and Kikimora (1992) as Leshy
 Darkwing Duck (1991–92) as Launchpad McQuack

Awards
 Honored Artist of the RSFSR (1971)
 People's Artist of the RSFSR (1984)
 State Prize of the Russian Federation (1994)
 Order of Honour (1996)

References

External links

1932 births
1999 deaths
20th-century Russian male actors
Male actors from Saint Petersburg
Honored Artists of the RSFSR
People's Artists of the RSFSR
Recipients of the Order of Honour (Russia)
State Prize of the Russian Federation laureates
Russian male film actors
Russian male stage actors
Russian male voice actors
Soviet male film actors
Soviet male stage actors
Soviet male voice actors